Suzanne VanOrman (born July 1939) is an American politician from Oregon. A Democrat, she was a member of the Oregon House of Representatives, first elected in 2008. VanOrman, who resides in Hood River, represents District 52, which includes all of Hood River County and parts of Clackamas and Multnomah counties. She beat mixed martial artist and Olympic silver medalist Matt Lindland 52%–48% in the 2008 general election.

VanOrman served as Vice-Chair of the Agriculture, Natural Resources and Rural Communities committees. She also served on the Education and Human Services committees.

In 2010, she lost re-election to Republican Mark Johnson.

Career 
For more than 22 years, VanOrman was Executive Director of the Mid-Columbia Children’s Council. Under her leadership, the Council grew to eventually offer pre-K Head Start comprehensive services to 482 families in the greater Columbia Gorge area.

VanOrman served on the Oregon City Commission, the South Fork Water Board, Tri-Cities Services Budget Committee, Hood River County Commission on Children and Families, and the Clackamas County Children’s Commission. Most recently Suzanne was made a Committee Member of the Hood River Valley High School Local Committee.

References

External links
VanOrman's campaign

Living people
1939 births
Politicians from Dubuque, Iowa
Members of the Oregon House of Representatives
Women state legislators in Oregon
People from Hood River, Oregon
21st-century American politicians
21st-century American women politicians